Bebearia picturata is a butterfly in the family Nymphalidae. It is found in the central part of the Democratic Republic of the Congo.

References

Butterflies described in 1989
picturata
Endemic fauna of the Democratic Republic of the Congo
Butterflies of Africa